is a Japanese former wrestler who competed in the 1976 Summer Olympics.

References

1949 births
Living people
Olympic wrestlers of Japan
Wrestlers at the 1976 Summer Olympics
Japanese male sport wrestlers
Olympic bronze medalists for Japan
Olympic medalists in wrestling
Medalists at the 1976 Summer Olympics
20th-century Japanese people
21st-century Japanese people
World Wrestling Champions
World Wrestling Championships medalists